The Phanaroea plain (Φανάροια), the modern Erbaa Plain, is a plain lying mostly in the Erbaa district of Tokat Province in the Black Sea region of Turkey. The Yeşilırmak (ancient Iris) runs along its western edge and is joined by the Kelkit in the northwest corner of the plain. Its altitude ranges from about 200–260 m. The Niksar plain to the east, at 260–300 m altitude, continues the Erbaa plain, and is generally considered part of the Phanaroea.

In the 20th century, it produced grain, fruit, vegetables, tobacco, rice, and opium poppy.

The ancient city of Eupatoria lay near the confluence of the two rivers. The ancient city of Cabira was probably located in the Niksar plain.

Strabo describes Phanaroea as rich in olives and vines and having the best soil in the Pontus.

See also

 1942 Niksar–Erbaa earthquake

Notes

Geography of Tokat Province
Plains of Turkey
Pontus (region)